Pain Navai Mahalleh (also Romanized as Pā’īn Navā’ī Maḩalleh; also known as Navāee Maḩalleh-ye Soflá) is a village in Emamzadeh Abdollah Rural District, Dehferi District, Fereydunkenar County, Mazandaran Province, Iran. At the 2006 census, its population was 149, in 39 families.

References 

Populated places in Fereydunkenar County